Kario Oquendo ((born January 28, 2000) is an American college basketball player for the Georgia Bulldogs of the Southeastern Conference (SEC). He previously played for the Florida SouthWestern Buccaneers.

High school career
Oquendo attended both Titusville High School and  Astronaut High School in Titusville, Florida. As a junior, Oquendo averaged 21.2 points and 8.3 rebounds per game leading his team to a 20–6 record. He would forgo his senior season and enroll at Florida SouthWestern State College.

College career

Florida SouthWestern State
Oquendo played one season at Florida SouthWestern State. As a freshman, he averaged 13.5 points and 3.8 rebounds per game. He decided to transfer. He had offers from Oregon , PITT, and Marquette but he ultimately transferred to Georgia.

Georgia
Oquendo scored 24 points in a 82–79 upset win over Memphis. He scored a then career-high 28 points vs Mississippi State in an 88–72 defeat. He would later best that vs Texas A&M with a 33 point showing resulting in an 91–77 defeat. Oquendo would enter the transfer portal, but he ultimately returned to Georgia.

Career statistics

College

|-
| style="text-align:left;"| 2020–21
| style="text-align:left;"| Florida SouthWestern
| 23 || 10 || 22.2 || .554 || .403 || .696 || 3.8 || 1.3 || .7 || .5 || 13.5
|-
| style="text-align:left;"| 2021–22
| style="text-align:left;"| Georgia 
| 31 || 31 || 29.5 || .453 || .272 || .712 || 4.3 || .8 || 1.2 || .5 || 15.2

References

External links
Georgia Bulldogs Bio
Florida SouthWestern Buccaneers bio

Living people
2000 births
Georgia Bulldogs basketball players
Basketball players from Florida
American men's basketball players
Shooting guards